Drinovci is a village in the municipality of Grude in Bosnia and Herzegovina.

Geographical location 
Drinovci are located on the southeast side of the Imotski karst field. The relatively large area of the town and 2,569 inhabitants, according to the 2013 census, places Drinovci in the ranks of the large Herzegovian villages.

Population

1971 – 2013 Censuses 

According to the 2013 census, its population was 2,569.

Notable people 
 Paškal Buconjić, bishop
 Bazilije Pandžić, historian
 Antun Branko Šimić, poet

Sport
HNK Drinovci, football club that spent four seasons in Bosnia and Herzegovina's second tier.

References

Populated places in Grude